Aleksei Yakovlevich Kapler (also Alexei, born Lazar Yankelevich Kapler; 28 September 1903 – 11 September 1979) was a prominent Soviet filmmaker, screenwriter, actor and writer. He was known as screenwriter of many Soviet movies, such as Lenin in 1918, Amphibian Man, The Blue Bird and Striped Trip, as well as one of the anchors and directors of TV program Kinopanorama (a cinema overview). In 1941, Kapler was awarded the Stalin Prize.

Internments in the Gulag
Kapler is also known as the first love of Joseph Stalin's then teenage daughter Svetlana Alliluyeva, who was more than 20 years his junior. According to Stalin's daughter, that was the reason for Kapler to be sentenced in 1943 to five years in exile on charges of anti-Soviet agitation. He was sent to Vorkuta region, where he worked as a photographer and lived in a tiny room partitioned off in the corner of the local photo studio.

In 1948, he was convicted a second time and spent five more years in Inta labour camps, being finally released only in July 1953, after Stalin's death. After returning from the Gulag, Kapler continued working on cinema and TV.

Personal life
His first wife was the actress Tatiana Tarnowska (1898–1994), daughter of Countess Maria Tarnowska. With Tatiana he had a son, Anatoly (b. 1927). Kapler's last wife was poet Yulia Drunina.

Filmography 
1926 The Overcoat (actor)
1930 Pravo Na Zhenshchinu (A Licence to Have a Woman) (silent film, Ukrainfilm studio, Kyiv, director), shown at the XXV Moscow International Film Festival, 2003
1931 Shakhta 12–28 (Mine 12-28) (director)
1939 Lenin v 1918 Godu (Lenin in 1918) (screenwriter)
1942 Slavny Maly (A Good Lad) (screenwriter)
1943 Den za Dnyom (Day After Day) (screenwriter)
1957 Za Vitrinoy Univermaga (Behind Show-Window) (screenwriter)
1976 Sinyaya Ptitsa (The Blue Bird) (screenwriter)
1987 Soshedshie s nebes (Descended From the Heavens), Lenfilm studio, is based on Kapler's story, Two of Twenty Millions.
1996 Vozvrashchenie bronenostsa (Return of the Battleship) is based on Kapler's story, Return of the Battleship

Notes and references

External links
 
Nicholas Thompson, "My Friend, Stalin’s Daughter: The complicated life of Svetlana Alliluyeva." The New Yorker, March 24, 2014.

1903 births
1979 deaths
Film people from Kyiv
People from Kiev Governorate
Academic staff of the Gerasimov Institute of Cinematography
Academic staff of High Courses for Scriptwriters and Film Directors
Stalin Prize winners
Recipients of the Order of Lenin
Recipients of the Order of the Red Banner of Labour
Gulag detainees
Male screenwriters
Jewish male actors
Jewish Ukrainian actors
Jewish Ukrainian writers
Ukrainian Jews
Soviet film directors
Soviet rehabilitations
Soviet screenwriters
Soviet television presenters
Deaths from cancer in Russia